"Ave Regina caelorum" is one of the Marian antiphons said or sung in the Liturgy of the Hours at the close of compline. In the Roman Breviary as revised by Pope Pius V in 1569 it was assigned for this use from compline of 2 February until compline of Wednesday of Holy Week. Since the revision of the Liturgy of the Hours in 1969, the only Marian antiphon for whose use a fixed period is laid down is the Easter season antiphon Regina caeli.

Like the other Marian antiphons, Ave Regina caelorum has been set to polyphonic music by composers such as Leonel Power (d. 1445), Guillaume Du Fay (d. 1474), Tomás Luis de Victoria (1548-1611), Marc-Antoine Charpentier, 3 settings, H.22, H.19, H. 45 and Joseph Haydn (1732-1809).

The prayer, whose author is unknown, is found in manuscripts from the twelfth century onward.

Text 

The antiphon itself consists of two stanzas, each of four lines:

Compline, as revised in 1969 after the Second Vatican Council, ends with the antiphon alone. In the earlier Roman Breviary the following  versicle (℣) and response (℟) and the following prayer are added to the antiphon:

Musical settings
Marc-Antoine Charpentier has composed one  Ave Regina coelorum H.19, for 3 voices and bc (1670) and one Ave Regina coelorum H.45 (1690) for soloists, chorus, 2 violins and bc.

See also
 Alma Redemptoris Mater
 Regina caeli
 Queen of Heaven
 Salve Regina
 The Glories of Mary

References

External links
 "Ave Regina Caelorum" Gregorian Chant
 

Marian antiphons
Marian devotions